Tingvoll is a municipality in Møre og Romsdal county, Norway. It is part of the Nordmøre region. The administrative centre is the village of Tingvollvågen. Other villages include Meisingset, Kvisvik, and Torjulvågen. The municipality covers a peninsula on the mainland as well as a few surrounding islands. Norwegian National Road 70 and European route E39 both run through the municipality.

The  municipality is the 253rd largest by area out of the 356 municipalities in Norway. Tingvoll is the 226th most populous municipality in Norway with a population of 2,960.

General information

The parish of Tingvoll was established as a municipality on 1 January 1838 (see formannskapsdistrikt law). On 1 January 1866, the northern part of the municipality (population: 1,222) was separated to form the new Straumsnes Municipality. On 1 January 1874, a part of Stangvik Municipality (population: 61) was transferred to Tingvoll. On 1 January 1877, the Tiltereidet and Meisalstranden part of Tingvoll (population: 212) on the west side of the Sunndalsfjorden was transferred to Nesset Municipality. On 1 January 1880, the Torjulvågen area of Halsa Municipality (population: 240) was transferred to Tingvoll. On 1 January 1890, the Rausand area of Tingvoll (population: 101) was transferred to Nesset Municipality.

During the 1960s, there were many municipal mergers across Norway due to the work of the Schei Committee. On 1 January 1964, the municipality of Straumsnes (population: 1,160) and the part of Frei Municipality on the island of Aspøya (population: 147) were merged into Tingvoll. On 1 January 1965, the part of Tingvoll located on the western side of the Tingvollfjorden (population: 778) was transferred to Gjemnes Municipality and the Åsprong-Sandnes area near Meisingset (population: 26) was transferred from Stangvik Municipality to Tingvoll.

Name
The municipality (originally the parish) is named after the old Tingvoll farm, since the first Tingvoll Church was built there. The first element is þing which means "thing" or "assembly" and the last element is vǫllr which means "meadow" (so Tingvoll means "meeting place", like Þingvellir in Iceland). Before 1918, the name was written Tingvold.

Coat of arms
The coat of arms was granted on 7 September 1984. The arms show five green oak leaves on a gray background. Each leaf represents one of the five main villages in the municipality: Tingvollvågen, Straumsnes, Gyl, Torjulvågen, and Meisingset. The oak leaves are chosen as a symbol for the municipality as Norway's northernmost oak forests can be found in the municipality.

Churches
The Church of Norway has two parishes within the municipality of Tingvoll. It is part of the Indre Nordmøre prosti (deanery) in the Diocese of Møre.

History
Eight or nine centuries ago, Tingvoll was the site of the Nordmøre Ting. There was a flat field there, which in Norwegian is called voll. It was here that meetings were held, called ting, thus the name Tingvoll. The name has the same origin as the Scottish town of Dingwall, the parliament of the Isle of Man Tynwald, the English town of Thingwall (which Norwegian Vikings colonised) Wirral Peninsula, and Þingvellir in Iceland.

Tingvoll Church, also known as the Nordmøre Cathedral (Nordmørsdomen), was built around 1180 at the village of Tingvollvågen.

Government
All municipalities in Norway, including Tingvoll, are responsible for primary education (through 10th grade), outpatient health services, senior citizen services, unemployment and other social services, zoning, economic development, and municipal roads. The municipality is governed by a municipal council of elected representatives, which in turn elect a mayor.  The municipality falls under the Møre og Romsdal District Court and the Frostating Court of Appeal.

Municipal council
The municipal council of Tingvoll is made up of 25 representatives that are elected to four year terms. The party breakdown of the council is as follows:

Mayor
The mayors of Tingvoll (incomplete list):
2019–present: Ingrid Waagen (Sp)
2015-2019: Milly Bente Nørsett (Ap)
2011-2015: Peder Hanem Aasprang (Sp)
2007-2011: Ole Morten Sørvik (H)

Geography
Tingvoll Municipality is a peninsula surrounded by the Tingvollfjorden, Vinjefjorden, Freifjorden, Halsafjorden, and Trongfjorden. The municipality also includes some islands including Aspøya. The Bergsøysund Bridge (part of the European route E39 highway) connects Aspøya to the neighboring island of Bergsøya to the west.

Climate
Tingvoll has a temperate oceanic climate (Cfb in the Köppen climate classification), also known as a marine west coast climate.
The wettest season is autumn and early winter. The driest season is spring. 
The all-time high is  recorded 9 July 2014. Earlier weather stations have recorded colder lows. The Tingvoll weather station started recording January 1992.

Eco-municipality
Tingvoll has been a self declared Eco-municipality since 1990, when the municipal council signed the declaration. The movement of eco-municipalities started among rural municipalities in Finland and later in Sweden in the 1980s. The idea was to inspire local economic and cultural development within a sustainable framework. In Tingvoll, the work started with a program for environmental education of the members of the council and the executive officers. The schools adapted national programs for environmental education.

A main part of the early years of eco-municipality, was the program for composting waste from the households. A new type of insulated bin was developed (Hagakompen) to assure composting could handle meat and fish waste, and work well in wintertime as well.

The Bioforsk Organic Food and Farming Division is located at Tingvoll.

Notable people 
 Martha G. Thorwick (1863 in Tingvoll — 1921) an American clubwoman and medical doctor based in San Francisco
 Gunvor Hals (born 1953 in Tingvoll) a Norwegian television personality
 Nils Erik Ulset (born 1983 in Tingvoll) a Norwegian biathlete, cross-country skier and three time Paralympic Champion

Sister cities
Tingvoll has sister city agreements with the following places:
  Bunda Town, Bunda District, Tanzania

References

External links
Municipal fact sheet from Statistics Norway 
Regional tourist information

 
Nordmøre
Municipalities of Møre og Romsdal
1838 establishments in Norway